Mkomazi is a town in northeastern Tanzania in the Tanga Region.

Transport 

It is served by a station on the Tanga line of Tanzanian Railways.

See also 

 Railway stations in Tanzania

References 

Populated places in Tanga Region